This is a list of Corsican flags, including symbolic national and sub-regional flags, standards and banners used exclusively in Corsica.

Regional flags

Historical flags

See also
List of French flags

Footnotes
 Registered at the French Society of Vexillology.

References

Corsica